The Oracle Challenger Series – Newport Beach is a professional tennis tournament played on hardcourts. It is currently part of the ATP Challenger Tour and the WTA 125 tournaments. It is held annually in Newport Beach, California, United States since 2018.

Past finals

Men's singles

Women's singles

Men's doubles

Women's doubles

External links
 Official website

 
ATP Challenger Tour
Hard court tennis tournaments
Tennis tournaments in California
2018 establishments in California
Recurring sporting events established in 2018
Sports in Newport Beach, California